"Infinity" is a 2012 song recorded by music production and DJ duo Infinity Ink. The duo found fame in 2012 through "Games" on the Hot Creations label followed quickly by "Infinity" on the Crosstown Rebels label, released on 14 May 2012. The single was certified platinum by the Belgian Entertainment Association.

The song was sampled by Flo Rida on his 2013 single "Can't Believe It".

Charts
"Infinity" charted in France and in both the Flanders and Wallonia Belgian singles charts where it was released on WEA and distributed by Warner. The single was also a hit in France on SNEP, the official French singles chart.

Year-end charts

References

2012 singles
2012 songs
Electronic songs
House music songs
Number-one singles in Belgium
Song recordings produced by Mark Ralph (record producer)